Bryan Alaphilippe (born 17 August 1995) is a French former professional road cyclist. He retired in March 2021, while competing for French amateur team . He is the younger brother of Julian Alaphilippe.

Major results

2014
 7th Paris–Mantes-en-Yvelines
2015
 1st Bordeaux–Saintes
 1st Circuit des 4 Cantons
2016
 9th Grand Prix de Denain
2017
 1st Stage 3 Volta a Portugal
 4th Paris–Mantes-en-Yvelines
2019
 1st Stage 4 Ronde de l'Oise

References

External links
 
 
 

1995 births
Living people
French male cyclists
Sportspeople from Cher (department)
Cyclists from Centre-Val de Loire
21st-century French people